Itche Goldberg (Yiddish: איטשע גאָלדבערג; March 22, 1904 – December 27, 2006) was a Polish-born Yiddish language writer of children's books, poet, librettist, educator, literary critic, camp director, publisher, fundraiser, essayist, literary editor, Yiddish language and culture scholar, and left-wing political activist. He devoted his life to the preservation of the Yiddish language and secular Yiddish culture.

Early years
Goldberg was born in Opatów, Poland, and moved to Warsaw in 1914, attending Poznanski Teachers Seminary. In 1920 he moved to Toronto, Ontario, Canada, studying philosophy, German and political science at McMaster University. While in Toronto, he taught Yiddish at The Workmen's Circle/Arbeter Ring school; it was in Toronto that his leftist/pro-communist sympathies matured.

He moved to New York City in the late 1920s, and continued teaching Yiddish there as well as in Philadelphia, but left the socialist Workmen's Circle schools for the more radical Arbeter Ordn Shuln.

The education schism, with Goldberg and many schools leaving the Arbeter Ring to form the Ordn network, was part of an exceedingly vituperative break within the leftist Yiddish community between the communists and socialists (who the communists sometimes called "social fascists").

Yiddishist

Passing on the Yiddish tradition to future generations was a mainstay of his life. From 1937 to 1951 he was editor of Yunvarg, a children's magazine. He wrote many children's stories, and his book, Yiddish Stories for Young People, is still being used at Workmen's Circle schools. From 1970 to 1985 he was professor of Yiddish language and literature at Queens College (C.U.N.Y.). He may be currently best known as editor from 1964 to 2004 of the longest running journal of Yiddish literature, Yidishe Kultur. The frequency of publication went down during this period, as Yiddish writers and speakers gradually died off. The final edition was published in 2004. Yet, he clung to the notion that Yiddish can still be a living language.
He saw in the Yiddish/Jewish culture of Eastern Europe humanistic and progressive values. He felt that these were important, not religious ritual. He even criticized Nobel Prize–winning author I.B. Singer for not portraying these ideals in his writings.

Leftist
Goldberg, a secular Jew, had been closely associated with left-wing causes for many years. There were probably several threads to his attraction to a radical cause. His close associates in Toronto were Communists, including his brother-in-law, who shared his revolutionary world view of social justice.

He saw the Soviet Union as the salvation for the Jewish national and social problems. Also, he described an embedded rebelliousness in those doubly alienated, "suffering and benefiting from 'rejection [and persecution] by the Gentiles, but also their own rejection of the narrowness of the rabbi and merchant dominated shtetl life'".

Shortly after moving to New York City, he became director of the Arbeter Ordn Shuln, and helped set up a nationwide network of these schools, reaching a peak number of 140. Best described as supplemental schools, they aimed at promoting Yiddish identity, as well as inculcating the concepts of class consciousness and social justice. For decades beginning in the 1920s, including two as director, he was associated with Camp Kinderland,  known as a "red diaper baby" camp.

From 1937-51, he was national school and cultural director of the Jewish People's Fraternal Order, a branch of the pro-Communist International Workers Order. At its peak after World War II the JPFO had 50,000 members.

When the IWO was about to be liquidated during the Red Scare in 1954 by the Department of Insurance of New York State (IWO was a fiscally sound fraternal benefit insurance company with close 200,000 members in its peak years, 1946–47), Itche withdrew the Yiddish shuls from the JPFO in order to preserve them, creating the independent Service Bureau for Jewish Education so that the schools could continue to function. In the anti-left atmosphere of the period, this effort was only partially successful.

Over time he made a transition to democratic socialism, eventually seeing the Soviet Union as an anti-model. By the 1950s his enthusiasm for the Soviet Union had completely evaporated, particularly after the Soviets executed Jewish writers in 1952.

Beginning in 1957 Yiddishe Kultur co-sponsored an annual public remembrance of the 12 August 1952 murders.

Nevertheless, he remained a central figure in the Jewish left for decades. Goldberg wrote and lectured frequently on the proud Jewish content he found in the works of such Soviet Yiddish writers as Perets Markish, David Hofstein, and David Bergelson. The Yidisher Kultur Farband (YKUF) in whose leadership Goldberg served for many years published numerous works by these authors when other Yiddish publishers in the west rejected them as outside of the Yiddish canon.

Centenary and accolades 
In honor of his 100th birthday the Jewish People's Philharmonic Chorus had a concert which included a musical adaptation of I.L. Peretz's "Oyb Nit Nokh Hekher", with libretto by Itche Goldberg. In another 100th birthday tribute, Jerrold Nadler honored him in the United States House of Representatives by saying: "Mir shatsn op ayer vunderlekhe arbet l'toyves der yidisher kultur vos hot baraykhert dem gontsn Yiddishn yishev." (English translation ″We honor your wonderful work for the benefit of Yiddish culture, which enriches the entire Jewish community.″)

Goldberg had won the Itzik Manger Prize for Yiddish literature in 1985.

Death
He died at age 102. His last book was Essayen Tsvey (Essays Two) in 2004, when he was 100 years. In honor of this publication, a commemoration of his life was held on July 25, 2006, sponsored by YIVO and League for Yiddish. A Josh Waletzky documentary was made of his life at age 101, "Itche Goldberg, A Century Of Yiddish Letters", and was shown at this event.

Quotes
"The split in the Socialist ranks was very powerful and harmful, and it was about attitudes to the Soviet Union".

“Never, never in history, did we produce so many poets and so much poetry in such a short period of time, barely one century. It is rare to find so much creativity in the entire history of our involvement with other languages. Look at the Tanakh—you have any number of splendors put together by various writers over the course of centuries. But here, they weren't given any time. Time was so short for all of us. And we're speaking only of poetry. But the prose that was produced! ... It was a time of exceptional, history-making creativity. And if we don’t understand this, we will perhaps not understand how to inherit or what to inherit.” (Speaking of Yiddish literature in first half of 20th century)

“Just because I'm secular doesn't mean I'm antireligious.”

"The need to keep Yiddish alive in one shape or another is very basic. And after what we went through — the loss not only of six million but also Eastern Europe — do you allow a culture to drift away and stop existing?"

"You can't possibly see a future Jewish life with the disappearance of a 1,000-year-old language and with it a 1,000-year-old culture. Somehow it has to be there."

"There was no question about our Jewishness or Jewish consciousness and the Jewish consciousness led us very naturally to the Soviet Union. Here was Romania, anti-Semitic; here was Poland, which was anti-Semitic. Suddenly we saw how Jewish culture was developing in the Soviet Union. It was really breathtaking. You had the feeling that both the national problem was solved and the social problem was solved. This was no small thing. It was overpowering and we were young."

"We're dealing with a language that is about 1,000 years old and a literature that is 600 or 700 years old. What developed was an extraordinary and profound modern literature which would become the equivalent of French and German literature."

"I only have two dreams. One dream is that someone will knock on the door and I will open it and they give me a check for $150,000 for the magazine. Second dream is that someone knocks at the door and I open it up and he gives me a corned beef sandwich. Those are my only two dreams. I'm not asking for much. Really, I'm not. And I think they're both reachable."

"They were killed simply because they were Jewish intellectuals. Their Jewishness was the reason. They were all stamped as spies." (RE: 1952 Stalin victims)

At age 100: "The question of where we go from here is on my mind a lot. What’s happened to socialism? What is the future of Yiddishism? When I came, at age 21, into the Workmen’s Circle shule in Toronto, I had so much eagerness, energy, and faith in socialism and in Yiddishism. Now I have insecurity. But I am used to insecurity. For over forty years I have published Yidishe Kultur without ever being able to secure its existence!"

References

External links
Vilnius University Award
"Editor Strives to Save Yiddish Journal"
NYTimes Conversation With Goldberg
"Fight To Save Yiddish"
Baltimore Sun interview
Goldberg on Khayim Zhitlovsky

1904 births
2006 deaths
American people of Polish-Jewish descent
Jewish American writers
American centenarians
Men centenarians
Secular Jews
Yiddish-language writers
People with acquired American citizenship
20th-century American Jews
21st-century American Jews
Polish emigrants to the United States
Itzik Manger Prize recipients